The Church of Saint Anthony of Padua is a Roman Catholic church in Nunić, Croatia.

History

The church was built in the 14th century. Inside of it there is a tombstone from 1203, which means on that place was church in old Croatian era.

It was renovated in 1971.

During the Croatian War of Independence it was completely robbed by Serbs. Also was damaged part of the church inventory and destroyed picture of Saint Anthony (from 1856).

In 1999 it was again renovated.
The church serves as rehab centre for drug dependency and is run by Roman Catholic priests.

References 

Churches in Croatia
Buildings and structures in Šibenik-Knin County